Ab Bid (also Romanized as Āb Bīd; also known as Āb Bīd-e Lalah) is a village in Javid-e Mahuri Rural District, in the Central District of Mamasani County, Fars Province, Iran. At the 2006 census, its population was 45, in 11 families.

References 

Populated places in Mamasani County